The 2022 Epsom Derby was the 243rd annual running of the Derby horse race which took place at Epsom Downs Racecourse on 4 June 2022. The race was sponsored for the second time by the online car-dealer Cazoo.

Due to COVID-19 pandemic, the first entries were closed in February 2022.

The race was won by Desert Crown, owned by Suaeed Suhail, trained by Sir Michael Stoute and ridden by Richard Kingscote. It was Stoute's sixth win in the race and at 78 he became the oldest-known Derby-winning trainer.
Kingscote was winning the Derby for the first time, in his second ride in the race.

Full result
Reference - Racing Post result 

Winning time: 2 min 36.38 sec

* The distances between the horses are shown in lengths or shorter; shd = short head; hd = head; nk = neck.† Trainers are based in Great Britain unless indicated.

Form analysis

Two-year-old races 
Notable runs by the future Derby participants as two-year-olds in 2021
 Hoo Ya Mal - 2nd in Flying Scotsman Stakes
 Masekela - 1st in Denford Stakes, 2nd in Superlative Stakes
 Piz Badile - 2nd in Eyrefield Stakes
 Royal Patronage - 1st in Acomb Stakes, 1st in Royal Lodge Stakes
 Stone Age - 2nd in Criterium de Saint-Cloud, 2nd in Juvenile Stakes
 Westover - 2nd in Silver Tankard Stakes

Road to Epsom 
Early-season appearances in 2022 and trial races prior to running in the Derby:
 Changingoftheguard - 1st in Chester Vase
 Desert Crown - 1st in Dante Stakes
 Glory Daze - 2nd in Leopardstown Derby Trial
 Grand Alliance - 2nd in Blue Riband Trial Stakes
 Hoo Ya Mal - 2nd in Newmarket Stakes, 3rd in Craven Stakes
 Masekela - 2nd in Feilden Stakes
 Nahanni - 1st in Blue Riband Trial Stakes
 Nations Pride - 1st in Newmarket Stakes
 Piz Badile - 1st in Ballysax Stakes
 Sonny Liston - 3rd in Dee Stakes
 Star of India - 1st in Dee Stakes
 Stone Age - 1st in Leopardstown Derby Trial
 Westover - 1st in Sandown Classic Trial

Subsequent Group 1 wins
Group 1 / Grade I victories after running in the Derby:
 Nations Pride – Saratoga Derby (2022)
 Westover – Irish Derby (2022)

References

2022 in horse racing
2022 in English sport
 2022
2022 Epsom Derby
June 2022 sports events in the United Kingdom